Artocarpus elasticus of the Mulberry Family (Moraceae) and commonly called terap nasi or terap, is a rainforest tree of maritime and mainland Southeast Asia, growing  up to  (occasionally as much as 214 feet (65 meters)) in height with a diameter at breast height of about . The stipules are up to eight inches (twenty centimeters) long, among the largest known. The trees are dioecious (male and female flowers on separate trees). It produces a fruit like a small breadfruit. The male capitulae produce clouds of pollen, and pollenisation is apparently by wind.

References

elasticus
Flora of Malesia
Flora of Myanmar
Flora of Thailand
Plants described in 1825